Sisters is the debut album by Scottish indie pop band the Bluebells, released in 1984.

The only "proper" full-length album released by the band during their short career (1983's The Bluebells was a mini-album released in the U.S. showcasing their singles), Sisters featured remixed versions of earlier singles "Cath" and "Everybody's Somebody's Fool" as well as the contemporary singles "I'm Falling" and "Young at Heart". The album reached No. 22 on the UK Albums Chart in August 1984.

In 2020, it was announced that the album would be re-released by Last Night From Glasgow, on their Past Night From Glasgow label, on vinyl and CD.

Critical reception
The Rolling Stone Album Guide called Sisters "highly accomplished and truly smart pop." Trouser Press deemed it "utterly wonderful," writing that the songs are "subtly shaded with country fiddles and mandolins, ringing guitars, a light bouncy beat and choruses that you’ll be humming all the way home." NME listed it as the 50th best album of 1984.

Track listing
All songs by Robert Hodgens, except where noted. All songs produced by Bob Andrews and Colin Fairley, except where noted.

Original release
"Everybody's Somebody's Fool" – 3:40 
"Young at Heart" (Robert Hodgens, Bobby Valentino, Siobhan Fahey, Sara Dallin, Keren Woodward) – 3:24
"I'm Falling" (Robert Hodgens, Kenneth McCluskey) – 5:12
"Will She Always Be Waiting" – 4:10 Produced by Elvis Costello and Colin Fairley
"Cath" – 3:07
"Red Guitars"  – 3:14
"Syracuse University"  – 4:30
"Learn to Love"  – 3:35 Produced by Alan Shacklock
"The Patriot Game" (Dominic Behan) – 4:00
"South Atlantic Way"  – 5:38

Cassette version
The track "Holland" stands for "Hope our love lasts and never dies".

Side one
"Everybody's Somebody's Fool" – 3:40 
"Young at Heart" (Robert Hodgens, Siobhan Fahey, Sara Dallin, Keren Woodward) – 3:24
"I'm Falling" (Robert Hodgens, Kenneth McCluskey) – 5:12
"Will She Always Be Waiting" – 4:10 Produced by Elvis Costello and Colin Fairley
"Cath" – 3:07
"Holland" (Kenneth Mccluskey, David McCluskey) – 3:30

Side two
"Red Guitars"  – 3:14
"Syracuse University"  – 4:30
"Learn to Love"  – 3:35 Produced by Alan Shacklock
"The Patriot Game" (Dominic Behan) – 4:00
"South Atlantic Way"  – 5:38
"Aim in Life" (McCluskey) – 3.02 Produced by Elvis Costello

Personnel
 Kenneth McCluskey – lead vocals, harmonica
 Neil Baldwin – bass (2, 6, 7, 10) 
 Robert Hodgens – vocals, guitar
 Craig Gannon – guitar (1, 6, 7, 10)
 David McCluskey – drums
 Bobby Valentino – violin
Laurence Donegan – bass (2–5, 8, 9)
Russell Irvine – guitar (2–5, 8, 9)
Ray Russell – string arrangements
Technical
Derek Ridgers, Paul Cox – photography
Peter Barrett – artwork
Recorded at Highland Studios, Inverness and Jam Studios, London; mixed at Abbey Road Studios and Red Bus Studios, London

References

1984 debut albums
The Bluebells albums
London Records albums
Sire Records albums
Albums produced by Bob Andrews (keyboardist)
Albums produced by Elvis Costello